Neuamt was a bailiwick (Obervogtei) of the Zürichgau, a subject territory of Zürich within the Old Swiss Confederacy, from 1442 to 1798.

The bailiwick was detached from the County of Kyburg as the latter was given to emperor Frederick III to ensure his support in the Old Zürich War. The territories of Kyburg left of the Glatt river were retained by Zürich, and were not re-attached to Kyburg when the county was re-purchased from the Habsburg ten years later. The bailiwick was administered by two reeves (Obervögte) residing in Zürich.

Ennethöri was a settlement east of the Glatt, attached to the Neuamt in 1667/89.

References 

 Sammlung Schweizerischer Rechtsquellen, I. Abteilung: Die Rechtsquellen des Kantons Zürich. Neue Folge, Zweiter Teil: Rechte der Landschaft. Band 1: Thomas Weibel: Das Neuamt. Aarau 1996 (ssrq-sds-fds.ch).
 Thomas Weibel: Historische Kurzbeschreibungen der Siedlungen im Neuamt. Zürich 1995 (ssrq-sds-fds.ch).
 
 

History of Zürich
Glatt basin